Tamara Patterson Barringer (born December 1, 1958) is an American lawyer and judge. She is an associate justice of the North Carolina Supreme Court. She was a Republican state senator from North Carolina's 17th district for six years.

She received her Bachelor of Science in business administration and her Juris Doctor from the University of North Carolina at Chapel Hill.

Election results
Barringer ran in the 2012 election for the North Carolina Senate. She defeated Erv Portman (D) in the November 2012 general election.

In the November 2018 general election, she lost to Sam Searcy by a margin of 50 percent to 47 percent.

Barringer ran for the North Carolina Supreme Court in 2020 against incumbent Mark A. Davis. She won the election in November 2020.

Awards 
 2015 Champion for Children Award. Presented by Children’s Hope Alliance and Benchmarks.

References

External links

|-

Living people
21st-century American judges
21st-century American politicians
21st-century American women politicians
Justices of the North Carolina Supreme Court
Women state legislators in North Carolina
Democratic Party North Carolina state senators
UNC Kenan–Flagler Business School alumni
University of North Carolina School of Law alumni
University of North Carolina at Chapel Hill faculty
North Carolina State University faculty
21st-century American women judges
American women academics
1958 births